The 1957 Soviet Chess Championship was the 24th edition of USSR Chess Championship. Held from 20 January to 22 February 1957 in Moscow. The tournament was won by Mikhail Tal. The final were preceded by quarterfinals events at Frunze (won by Viktor Korchnoi, 17 points in 18 games), Tallinn (Iivo Nei/Alexey Suetin, 14/19), Yerevan (Alexander Tolush, 15½/19); semifinals at Leningrad (Abram Khasin, 11½/19), Kharkov (Vitaly Tarasov, 11½/18) and Tbilisi (Tigran Petrosian, 14½/19).

Table and results

Semifinals 

Bannik and Aroson beat Borisenko in a sixth place tiebreaker tournament.

Final 
The semi-final qualifiers joined Taimanov, Keres and Bronstein (who entered the final directly by ranking criteria of the Soviet Federation) to play the final in Moscow. Mikhail Botvinnik and Vasily Smyslov did not participate because they were preparing for the match for the World Championship.

References 

USSR Chess Championships
Championship
Chess
1957 in chess
Chess